The Airtam Frieze is a sculpture in stone of women, musicians from Kushan Bactria dating to the 1st or 2nd century AD, which was excavated from the ruins of Airtam, near Termez in southern Uzbekistan. Five musicians are represented among acanthas leaves, playing double-flute, drum, lute, harp and cymbals. The sculpture has been thought to have been part of the walls or the entrance of a Buddhist temple.

The sculpture is one of the earliest works of art to show a short lute-instrument clearly. Although not likely to be directly related, the instrument has features reminiscent of the citole, including its shape, four soundholes in the corners of the soundboard, and the position of its bridge at the bottom of the soundboard.

References

External links
Page with images of Airtam Frieze

Kushan Empire
Central Asian music
Central Asian musical instruments
Asian sculpture
Sculptures of women
Lutenists
Drummers
Harpists
Stone sculptures